Nemanja Milošević (born 18 August 1996) is a Serbian football midfielder who plays for Radnički Pirot.

References

External links
 
 Nemanja Milošević stats at utakmica.rs 
 

1996 births
Living people
Sportspeople from Leskovac
Association football midfielders
Serbian footballers
FK Jagodina players
FK Radnički Pirot players
Serbian SuperLiga players